Anthony O'Riordan (born 1966 in Bruff, County Limerick, Ireland) is an Irish retired sportsperson.  He played hurling with his local club Bruff and was a member of the Limerick senior inter-county team from 1987 until 1993.

References 

1966 births
Living people
Bruff hurlers
Limerick inter-county hurlers
Hurling selectors